Thalassa is an oceanographic research vessel operated by the Institut Français de Recherche pour l'Exploitation de la Mer (IFREMER), the French Institute for Research of the Exploitation of the Sea.

Thalassa was launched  in 1995 and commissioned to replace an eponymous ship of 1960.

References

External links 

 Thalassa on the Ifremer website
 Official website of Thalassa

Research vessels of France
Ships built in France
1995 ships